The Staro Gracko massacre was the mass killing of 14 Kosovo Serb farmers in the village of Staro Gracko in the Kosovo municipality of Lipjan on 23 July 1999. The killings occurred after Yugoslav troops withdrew from the region in the aftermath of the Kosovo War, and was the worst single crime in Kosovo since the conflict ended in June 1999. As of 2019 the perpetrators of the killings have never been found and held accountable.

Background
The Kosovo War ended on 11 June 1999 with the Yugoslav army (VJ) agreeing to withdraw its forces from Kosovo after a 78-day NATO bombing campaign. As many as 40,000 Yugoslav soldiers subsequently left Kosovo and were replaced by an estimated 50,000 NATO troops, while 170,000 Kosovar Serbs fled to Central Serbia.

Although the village of Staro Gracko, with a population of 300, was predominantly inhabited by ethnic Serbs and was home to eighty Serb and two Kosovo Albanian families, surrounding villages were inhabited by ethnic Albanians.

Massacre
On 23 July 1999, at approximately 9:13pm, British KFOR troops heard gunfire and contacted a NATO reaction-force which hurried to the scene. The NATO soldiers subsequently discovered the bodies of thirteen Serbs next to a combine harvester by an open field. A fourteenth body was discovered lying on a tractor nearby. The farmers had been returning home after a day of harvesting wheat.

The British patrol had visited the site just five hours before the bodies were discovered and found nothing strange.

When their corpses were discovered, it was reported that the men had been grouped together in a circle and shot dead. The bodies of some victims appeared to have been mutilated and disfigured with blunt instruments. The farmers had requested NATO protection seven days prior to the killings, but their pleas were ignored.

Aftermath

After the fourteen bodies were discovered, Canadian troops cordoned off the village. The bodies were then taken to a hospital in Pristina to be identified. The United Nations stated that women and children were among the victims.

Reaction
Kosovo Liberation Army leader Hashim Thaçi condemned the killings, calling them "[a] crazy act designed to wreck the improving relations between Kosovo Albanians and Serbs." Bernard Kouchner, the head of the United Nations Interim Administration Mission in Kosovo (UNMIK), said that he was "horrified" by the massacre and promised to bring "the perpetrators to justice without delay." Louise Arbour, the chief prosecutor of the International Criminal Tribunal for the former Yugoslavia (ICTY), said that she was "gravely concerned" and called for "an immediate investigation into the massacre."

Yugoslav President Slobodan Milošević blamed international peacekeeping forces for the massacre while VJ General Nebojša Pavković claimed the right to send Yugoslav troops back into Kosovo if the United Nations were not able to control the province.

See also
 List of massacres in the Kosovo War
 War crimes in the Kosovo War

Notes

1999 in Kosovo
Mass shootings in Kosovo
Mass shootings in Serbia
Massacres in 1999
Massacres in the Kosovo War
Massacres of Serbs
Albanian war crimes in the Kosovo War
July 1999 events in Europe
1999 mass shootings in Europe